The World Design Capital (WDC) is a city promotion project by the World Design Organization (formerly named the International Council of Societies of Industrial Design )to recognize and award accomplishments made by cities around the world in the field of design.

The World Design Capital (WDC) programme, designated every two years by the World Design Organization (WDO), recognizes cities for their effective use of design to drive economic, social, cultural, and environmental development. Through a year-long programme of events, the designated city showcases best practices in sustainable design-led urban policy and innovation that improve quality of life.

World Design Capitals by year

References

Design institutions
Industrial design
Capitals
Design events